Aman ki Asha (translation: "Hope for Peace") is a campaign jointly started by two leading media houses, The Jang Group of Pakistan, and The Times of India in India. The campaign aims for mutual peace and development of diplomatic and cultural relations between the two nations in South Asia. It was established on 1 January 2010.

Background

Aman ki Asha was inspired by the groundbreaking work of "Friends Without Borders", an international NGO, that launched bold, love-based people-to-people campaigns between the children and people of both countries between 2005 - 2007. The Times of India and the Jang Group both partnered with Friends Without Borders and stepped up their joint-efforts after the Dil se Dil ("From Heart to Heart") Border Concert was canceled in August 2007. "Peace efforts between India and Pakistan are the real need of the hour and only prudence, foresightedness and sincerity can do wonders for both countries. In this people of India and Pakistan communicate with each other."

See also
Indo-Pakistani Confederation
India-Pakistan relations
Track II diplomacy

References

External links
Aman ki Asha - The Times of India
Friends Without Borders

Political organisations based in India
Political organisations based in Pakistan
India–Pakistan relations
The Times of India
2010 establishments in Pakistan
2010 establishments in India